HC Donbas Donetsk Oblast (previous name Shakhtar-Academiya until June 2017) is a handball club from Donetsk. The club was formed in 1983 on the base of a previous handball club called Spartak Donetsk.

History
Through the 90's the club one of the leading forces in the Ukrainian Men's Handball Super League, winning the local league 3 times, and between seasons 1994/95-2005/06 the club never finished outside the top 3. The club also had success on the international arena, reaching the final of the EHF Cup in 1995/96.

After season 2005/06, the club started experiencing financial difficulties, and in season 2011/12 the club finished last in the league and was relegated. In the second league, in season 2012/13, the club managed to finish first and returned to the top tier.

Honours

Domestic
 Ukrainian Handball Super League
  Winners (3): 1996, 1997, 2002
  Runner-Up (1): 2004

International
 EHF Cup
  Runner-Up (1): 1995/96

References

External links
Old official Website
Official website

Shakhtar Donetsk
Ukrainian handball clubs
Sport in Donetsk Oblast
Mining sports teams